Konstantin Sergeevich Borisov (born 14 August 1984 in Smolensk) is a Russian cosmonaut who is scheduled to fly on board SpaceX Crew-7 in August 2023.

References

External links
 Astronaut.ru biography 
 Roscosmos biography 
 Spacefacts biography

1984 births
Living people
Russian cosmonauts
21st-century Russian people